The 53rd General Assembly of Prince Edward Island was in session from May 21, 1974, to May 28, 1978. The Liberal Party led by Alex Campbell formed the government.

Cecil A. Miller was elected speaker.

There were five sessions of the 53rd General Assembly:

Members

Kings

Prince

Queens

Notes:

References
 Election results for the Prince Edward Island Legislative Assembly, 1974-04-29
 O'Handley, Kathryn Canadian Parliamentary Guide, 1994 

Terms of the General Assembly of Prince Edward Island
1974 establishments in Prince Edward Island
1978 disestablishments in Prince Edward Island